Murderaz-e Bala may refer to:
 Murderaz-e Bala, Fars
 Murderaz-e Bala, Kohgiluyeh and Boyer-Ahmad